Timo Reus (born 2 May 1974) is a German former professional football who played as a goalkeeper in the 2. Bundesliga for SC Freiburg and LR Ahlen.

Career
Reus made his debut on the professional league level in the 2. Bundesliga for SC Freiburg on 10 August 1997 when he started in a game against FC Gütersloh.

References

External links
 
 

1974 births
Living people
People from Lahr
Sportspeople from Freiburg (region)
Association football goalkeepers
German footballers
Bundesliga players
2. Bundesliga players
SC Freiburg players
Rot Weiss Ahlen players
FC St. Pauli players
VfR Aalen players
Offenburger FV players
Footballers from Baden-Württemberg